Helophora is a genus of dwarf spiders that was first described by Anton Menge in 1866.

Species
 it contains five species, found in China, Russia, and the United States:
Helophora insignis (Blackwall, 1841) (type) – North America, Europe, Caucasus, Russia (Europe to Far East), Kyrgyzstan, China
Helophora kueideensis Hu, 2001 – China
Helophora orinoma (Chamberlin, 1919) – USA
Helophora reducta (Keyserling, 1886) – USA
Helophora tunagyna Chamberlin & Ivie, 1943 – USA

See also
 List of Linyphiidae species (A–H)

References

Araneomorphae genera
Holarctic spiders
Linyphiidae
Spiders of China
Spiders of North America